The Forlivese school of art was a group of Italian Renaissance painters and other artists. Most were born in Forlì or near it in the Emilia-Romagna region of Italy.  Some other artists went to Forlì to study.

As a Renaissance art movement, it lasted from the 14th through the 16th centuries.

Artists
Forlivese artists include:

Livio Agresti
Ansuino da Forlì
Antonio Belloni
Baldassarre Carrari il Giovane
Baldassarre Carrari il Vecchio
Antonio Fanzaresi
Giuseppe Maria Galleppini
Guglielmo da Forlì
Melozzo da Forlì
Livio Modigliani
Giovanni Antonio Nessoli
Francesco Menzocchi
Guglielmo degli Organi
Marco Palmezzano
Filippo Pasquali

References
Luigi Lanzi, Storia hi pittorica della Italia. Dal Risorgimento delle belle arti fin presso al fine del XVIII secolo, Piatti, Firenze 1834. Giorgio Viroli, ricordando che il testo era stato scritto nel 1789, di questo autore sottolinea "la ricchezza di cognizioni che egli offre sulla scuola artistica forlivese" (in G. Viroli, Per un modello di cultura figurativa. Forlì, città e museo, Istituto per i beni artistici culturali naturali della Regione Emilia-Romagna - Comune di Forlì, 1980 (?), p. 26.)
Giovanni Battista Cavalcaselle - J.A.Crowe, Storia della Pittura Italiana in Italia dal secolo II al secolo XVI, successors of Le Monnier, Firenze, 1875–1909, 11 volumi.
E. Casadei, Forlì e dintorni, Società Tipografica Forlivese, Forlì 1928.
Mostra di Melozzo e del Quattrocento romagnolo, a cura di C. Gnudi e L. Becherucci, Forlì, 1938 (rist. anastatica, Forlì, 1994).
AA.VV., Marco Palmezzano. Il Rinascimento nelle Romagne, catalogo della mostra, Cinisello Balsamo - Forlì, 2005.

F
Painters of Emilia-Romagna
Forlì
Italian art movements
Italian Renaissance
Culture in Emilia-Romagna
History of Emilia-Romagna
.